Al Lawrence may refer to:

 Al Lawrence (chess writer), American chess expert and author
 Al Lawrence (sprinter) (born 1961), Jamaican former athlete
 Al Lawrence (distance runner) (1930–2017), Australian Olympic medallist
 T.E. Lawrence (16 August 1888 – 19 May 1935), British wartime officer in WWI known to Arabs as Al-Lawrence

See also 
 Allan Lawrence (disambiguation)
 Albert Lawrence (disambiguation)